Bo Peep is a fictional character appearing in the Disney—Pixar Toy Story franchise. The character is primarily voiced by Annie Potts. She appears in the first two films as a supporting character, portrayed as a love interest to the protagonist, Woody. After being given away prior to the events of Toy Story 3, Bo returns in Toy Story 4. 

Bo Peep was created by John Lasseter, Andrew Stanton, Joe Ranft, and Pete Docter for the original 1995 feature film, being based on the nursery rhyme "Little Bo-Peep". She was later re-conceived by the development team behind Toy Story 4. 

The character received a generally positive reception in the first two films of the franchise, particularly towards the side plots involving her and Woody. Bo's reception in the fourth film received praise regarding her leading role, but criticism drawn towards her new redesign, concept, and feminist personality. Her leading role in Toy Story 4 contributed to the character making live meet-and-greet appearances in Disney theme Parks after the film's release.

Character design

Bo Peep was a secondary character in the first two films of the franchise, missing the main action in both of them. John Lasseter's wife Nancy considered Jessie as a great addition to the cast in Toy Story 2, because she was perceived as a stronger character, and she had more substance than Bo. 

However, Bo was given a major role in Toy Story 4. Regarding the portrayal of Bo in this film, story artist Carrie Hobson explained to GameSpot that the production staff decided to redefine the character for the fourth installment, working to nail down specific personality traits and ultimately positioning her as "a character who decided she didn't just want to sit on a shelf waiting for life to happen. She learned to adapt." Stylist interviewed some members of the staff, who explained that they "were trying to create a very strong character." To reinforce that idea, we never wanted to see her hair move." Regarding her look, Kihm added: "she’s athletic, and perhaps her new outfit gives her this sense of freedom to express that athleticism."

Personality
Bo Peep is portrayed as a very flirtatious, romantic, sensible and levelheaded toy. She is depicted as gentle, ladylike, and kindhearted. She has strong feelings for Woody and cares for him, which cause her (along with Slinky) to give him the benefit of the doubt when he allegedly murders Buzz Lightyear, whom she clearly considers attractive as well, and consistently whispers to the wall her worries about where Woody could be. Despite this, she still behaves like a free spirit. She only believes what she has witnessed for herself, such as when she looks into Lenny's visor and sees Buzz riding behind Woody aboard RC, while the rest of the toys immediately take her word for it. By the time she is moved to Molly's room, she becomes more of a leader amongst her toys as she is described by Woody to be the most capable of easing Molly's cries at night which often caused great dismay to everyone.

Since she parted ways with Andy, Bo has taken on a different point of view in life. As a lost toy, she never worries about being loved by a child and is open to see the world.

Voice acting
Voice actress Annie Potts voiced the character in Toy Story, Toy Story 2 and Toy Story 4. Regarding the new portrayal of Bo in the fourth film, Potts told Glamour that Bo "is modern, independent, capable and confident. Bo is written and conceived to be inspiring as she has weathered life’s ups and downs with grace." Story supervisor Valerie LaPointe said that Potts gave this new version of Bo a deeper voice, more grit and natural charm. Directing animator Patty Kihm said: "If you look closely, you'll see cracking in her hair – this is a subtle but constant reminder to the audience that she's made of porcelain.

In the video game Toy Story Racer, Bo is voiced by Rebecca Wink.

Appearances

Toy Story
The character is introduced in Toy Story as a porcelain figurine that is a detachable component of a bedside lamp along with a three-headed-sheep belonging to Andy's younger sister Molly. Nonetheless, Andy is seen playing with her and the rest of his toys; in Andy's games of imaginative play, Bo is used as the damsel-in-distress of the stories. Bo is the protagonist Woody's romantic interest, and acts as a voice of reason for him. She is depicted as gentle, ladylike, and kindhearted. Woody is excluded from the group of toys when Buzz Lightyear starts to attract more attention, but Bo remains loyal to him rather than taunting him because of Buzz's rise in popularity. After Woody accidentally knocked Buzz out the window, she is one of the only toys who is skeptical to believe that Woody would have purposely harmed Buzz, even with their tumultuous start. At the end of the film, when Woody and Buzz return, she gives Woody a kiss.

Toy Story 2
Bo makes a few brief speaking cameo appearances in the beginning and the end of Toy Story 2. She continues to show her attraction to Woody, flirting with him, and also assures him that Andy will always care about him.

Toy Story 3
Bo appeared briefly in the beginning of Toy Story 3 but doesn't speak. Her cameo is in the home movies Andy's mom makes. By the time of the actual events of the film, it is revealed that Bo is one of the toys that have been given away.

Toy Story 4

In August 2015, it was revealed that Bo Peep would have a major role in Toy Story 4, with initial reports stating that the film would center on a quest by Woody and Buzz to find Bo.

The film's opening sequence reveals how Bo is separated from Woody: three years following the events of Toy Story 2 after coordinating the rescue of RC, Bo and her sheep are given away by Andy's mother, and although Woody tries to convince Bo to stay, she states that she understands that part of the cycle of a toy is being taken away. For a brief moment, Woody considers going with Bo, but changes his mind after realizing that Andy needs him.

The main plot of the film is set after Andy gives his toys away to a girl named Bonnie at the end of the third film. Bonnie takes her toys—including Forky, whom she makes herself out of a spork and some trash—on a road trip. During the road trip, Forky gets lost and Woody goes after him to retrieve him. Woody spots Bo's lamp through a window of the store, and decides to look for Bo inside. Bo is not in the store, but Woody subsequently runs into her at a carnival near the store. Bo is still with her sheep, who are revealed to be female, and mentions the name of the three heads to Woody: Billy, Goat, and Gruff. In a conversation with Woody, Bo reveals her fate and that of her sheep after being given away: she spends two years being owned by a girl who does not care much for Bo, and then in the antique store, so she decides to leave and be on her own with Billy, Goat, and Gruff. Bo changes her outfit: she takes off her dress and transforms it into a cape, wears a white bandage to fix her broken right arm and a purple bandage to fix her broken left hand, and devotes her new life to help lost toys to return to their owners.

Bo rejects both Woody's proposal to go with him and become one of Bonnie's toys, since she has embraced her life as a "lost toy", as well as his call for help to search for Forky, though she ultimately agrees to accompany him to the latter, because she acquiesces "for old time's sake", and because Woody reminded her of how much she provided to Molly Davis as a toy when Molly was scared at night. To him though, she is still gentle, ladylike, and kindhearted. Bo reveals that her arm was broken off some time ago, but she managed to re-attach it to herself using scotch tape with his help. With the assistance of some lost toys and after being joined by Buzz, Bo leads the rescue mission for Forky, who has been captured by the film's main antagonist Gabby Gabby; however, Woody rushes out to free Forky in time to return to Bonnie, who is in the store, but this results in Bo's sheep being captured by Gabby Gabby and her toy henchmen. Though Bo manages to free her sheep, they are chipped in the process. Bo refuses a second attempt to free Forky, which causes Woody to angrily question her understanding of loyalty by saying that loyalty is something she wouldn't understand since she embraced herself as a "lost toy". After listening to Giggle badmouth Woody for his loyalty, Bo then realizes that loyalty is what she loves the most from Woody, and goes back to help and to reconcile with Woody.

The group try to help Gabby Gabby be adopted by a girl named Harmony who constantly visits the antique store, but she is rejected. Bo then helps Woody in trying to reach Bonnie along with Forky and Gabby Gabby, but Gabby Gabby spots a lost girl and decides to stay with her. Bo and Woody arrive to Bonnie's rental RV, and the two of them say goodbye to each other. But Woody feels uncertain about his decision and Buzz encourages him to stay with Bo, stating Bonnie will be okay without him. and he told Jessie, Dolly and the others everything for what Woody said about Bo with her feelings after their argument. Woody then runs back to Bo and they both bid farewell to the rest of Bonnie's Toys. In the mid-credits scene, Bo and Woody are seen helping toys being won by children who attend the carnival.

Lamp Life
A short film titled Lamp Life, which reveals Bo's whereabouts between leaving and reuniting with Woody, was released on Disney+ on January 31, 2020.

Meet and Greets 
In 2019 following the release of Toy Story 4, Bo Peep began meeting and greeting guests at the Disney Parks and Resorts. She is located in Fantasyland and in Toy Story Land.

Reception
Bo Peep's role in the first two films was called by Slate a "trophy for male cinematic heroism: a blond, blue-eyed, delicate, and conventionally beautiful female who existed to be rescued and to reward Woody for his heroic acts with chaste kisses." Her participation in action scenes in these films was described by The Washington Post as limited, "suggesting she was perhaps as fragile as porcelain itself."

Following her return and protagonism in Toy Story 4, Bo gained significant coverage. Describing her new look, The Telegraph says that "Wearing trousers instead of her old, pink floor-length shepherdess dress and bonnet, the new version of the Bo Peep is simply the right way to tell the story." Michael Cavna from The Washington Post wrote that "no character emerges from Pixar's Toy Story 4 exuding a stronger sense of self than Bo", and stated that Bo's new presence in the film rises as a symbol that reflects the contributions of leading women. Inkoo Kang from Slate considers that Bo had become "the rare female character expanded in a sequel whose journey doesn't feel secondary." Claire Corkery from The National wrote that Bo transformed "into a superhero who spearheads the many rescue missions the film series has become famous for." Josh Newis-Smith stated in Glamour that Bo "is just the empowered female Disney character we need in 2019."

However, there was negative criticism regarding Bo's new portrayal. Writer and film critic Stella Duffy said that the new portrayal of Bo is not feminist because "She's still going to fall in love, she's still going to have the happily ever after, that's not feminism! It's a woman who kicks off her skirt to reveal bloomers." Nell Frizzell from Vogue wrote that Bo changed from a "shepherdess in distress" into "badass", but considered that while movie studios (particularly Disney) have set a new distinction between damsels in distress and action heroines, all of them are slim, blond, and beautiful. Ernesto Huerta asked in Mexican newspaper Milenio if Bo's new personality responds to a need of the audience or to the political correctness that currently reigns in Hollywood. Beth Webb asked in British magazine Little White Lies: "The return of the sheep-herding heroine in Toy Story 4 signals a new chapter for the studio – but has anything changed behind the scenes?", in regards to what she considers the neglection of the female staff by animation studios, as well as John Lasseter's "missteps".

Journalist Danielle Tcholakian of GEN speculated that the Me Too movement played a role in Bo's new portrayal, noting that one producer, Jason Rivera, claimed that Bo was re-designed for the film by "Team Bo", a group of five women who deliberately excluded men from their work, and that another producer, Mark Nielsen, claimed that the movie was code-named "Peep" during development.

References

Female characters in animated films
Female characters in film
Fictional amputees
Fictional dolls and dummies
Fictional shepherds
Film characters introduced in 1995
Animated characters introduced in 1995
Toy Story characters
Fictional princesses